Cohabitation is a system of divided government that occurs in semi-presidential systems, such as France, whenever the president is from a different political party than the majority of the members of parliament. It occurs because such a system forces the president to name a premier (prime minister) who will be acceptable to the majority party within parliament. Thus, cohabitation occurs because of the duality of the executive: an independently elected president and a prime minister who must be acceptable both to the president and to the legislature.

France
Cohabitation took place in France in 1986–1988, 1993–1995, and 1997–2002. The president faced an opposition majority in the National Assembly and had to select his government from them.

Origins

Cohabitation was a product of the French Fifth Republic, albeit an unintended one. This constitution brought together a president with considerable executive powers and a prime minister, responsible before Parliament. The president's task was primarily to end deadlock and act decisively to avoid the stagnation prevalent under the French Fourth Republic; the prime minister, similarly, was to "direct the work of government", providing a strong leadership to the legislative branch and to help overcome partisan squabbles.

Since 1962, French presidents have been elected by popular vote, replacing the electoral college, which was only used once. This change was intended to give Fifth Republic presidents more power than they might have had under the original constitution.  While still seen as the symbol and embodiment of the nation, the president also was given a popular mandate. Of course, the majority party of the National Assembly retained power as well, but since the popularly elected president appointed the prime minister, the former was seen as having the upper hand in any conflict between executive and legislature. Furthermore, the imbalance is further illustrated by the fact that the president can dissolve the Assembly at any time (but not more than once in a year), whereas the legislature has no powers of removal against the president.

The sole caveat to this position of presidential pre-eminence was the fact that the president's selection to the premiership required approval by the National Assembly, the lower house of parliament: because the assembly can dismiss the government by a vote of no confidence, it follows that the prime minister must command a majority in the assembly. This was not a problem whilst the legislative majority was aligned with the president, and indeed, de Gaulle, who was responsible for inspiring much of the Constitution, envisioned that the president would resign if the people disavowed him in an assembly election, and would then elect a new president (there is no vice-president in France) and a new election takes places less than two months after a resignation, a new president being elected for a new, full term; that happened in 1969, when de Gaulle resigned because the people voted against a referendum proposed by him.

The first "near miss" with cohabitation occurred with the election of Socialist President François Mitterrand in 1981. A right-wing coalition headed by the Gaullist Rally for the Republic controlled the assembly at the time. Almost immediately, Mitterrand exercised his authority to call assembly elections, and the electorate returned an assembly with an absolute majority of Socialists, ending the presumed crisis.

However, when assembly elections were held as required in 1986, five years later, the Socialists lost their majority to the right. Mitterrand decided to remain president, beginning the first cohabitation.

Cohabitation in practice
There have been only three periods of cohabitation, but each is notable for illustrating the oscillation of powers between the president and prime minister.

Mitterrand–Chirac period (1986–1988)

After the 1986 assembly elections, Mitterrand was forced to nominate as a Prime Minister Jacques Chirac, the leader of Rally for the Republic (RPR), the largest party in the majority coalition. Throughout the cohabitation between Mitterrand and Chirac, the president focused on his foreign duties and allowed Chirac to control internal affairs. Since Mitterrand was distanced from these policies, Chirac began to reverse many of Mitterrand's reforms by lowering taxes and privatising many national enterprises.  There were however tense moments, such as when Mitterrand refused to sign ordonnances, slowing down reforms by requiring Chirac to pass his bills through parliament.  This lasted for two years until 1988 when the newly reelected Mitterrand called for new legislative elections that were won by a leftist majority, which lasted five years.

Mitterrand–Balladur period (1993–1995)

In 1993, President Mitterrand found himself in a similar position when the right won an 80% majority in the National Assembly elections. Once again, he was forced to appoint an opposition member from the RPR and Union for French Democracy (UDF) parties. This time he appointed Édouard Balladur to the post of prime minister, because Chirac was focused on running for president instead of being prime minister for the third time. Balladur maintained this post through the cohabitation until May 18, 1995 when Jacques Chirac took office as president.

Chirac–Jospin period (1997–2002)

In 1995, rightist leader Jacques Chirac succeeded Mitterrand as president, and, since the right had a majority in the assembly, he was able to appoint his fellow RPR member Alain Juppé as his prime minister, ending cohabitation by a change in the presidency.  This alignment of president and assembly should have lasted until at least the normally scheduled 1998 assembly elections.

However, in 1997, President Chirac made the ill-fated strategic decision to dissolve parliament and call for early legislative elections.  This plan backfired when the French electorate turned back to the leftists and removed the right-wing assembly majority.  Chirac was forced to appoint Socialist Lionel Jospin to the premiership.  Jospin remained prime minister until the elections of 2002, making this third term of cohabitation the longest ever, one of five years.  Chirac called this a state of 'paralysis', and found it particularly difficult to arrange campaign activities for the National Assembly.

With Jospin holding the premiership, Chirac's political influence was constrained and he had no say over certain major reforms being instituted by the left-wing majority. This included the 1998 legislation to shorten the working week from 39 to 35 hours, which came into effect in 2000.

Observations
Arend Lijphart contends that the French Fifth Republic usually operates under a presidential system, but when in cohabitation, this effectively changes, at least in terms of domestic policy, to a parliamentary system, in which the prime minister controls the legislative agenda and the president's powers are limited to foreign policy and defence.

A common problem during cohabitation is that each leader wants his or her own policies to be carried out so that the public is positive toward their strategies, and he or she will be elected when the time comes. Because each party is in competition, there is little room for progression since the friction between both sides holds each other back. Whilst leaders of the same political spectrum help each other in decision-making when in power concurrently, cohabitation can lead to a decline in national authority and make the country appear outwardly insecure.

Although originally believed to be improbable, France was governed under a cohabitation of leaders for almost half the period from 1986 to 2006, suggesting that French people no longer fear the prospect of having two parties share power.

Future prospects

In 2000, with the support of President Chirac, the term of a president was shortened from seven years to five years, a change accepted by a referendum.  Furthermore, legislative elections are now held one month after presidential ones, thus creating a coattail effect that encourages those who won the presidential election to confirm their vote one month later during legislative elections.

The near-simultaneity of presidential and legislative elections makes cohabitation less likely by reducing the prospect of major changes in public opinion between the two elections, but cohabitation remains a possibility even if public opinion remains stable. For example, a group of voters (e.g. voters on the left) may be split between two or more presidential candidates, thus making it unlikely that any of this group's candidates wins the presidential election, but these coordination problems may be resolved in the legislative election, leading to a different outcome in the two elections. Alternatively, a party that wins a majority of support in both the presidential and legislative elections may nonetheless fail to control the National Assembly because that support is distributed unequally across legislative districts. In another scenario, a presidential candidate from a new party may win the presidency despite his party not having the candidates or the party apparatus to win legislative elections.

Cohabitation can also occur if the presidential and legislative elections occur at different times due to extraordinary circumstances. For example, the president can dissolve the Assembly and call for new elections mid-term, which could theoretically lead to a different party winning (though the president would of course seek to avoid calling elections if this result were likely). The president could also die, be incapacitated, resign, or be impeached during his term, leading to a new presidential election. Cohabitation could result, although the new president would then be likely to call new assembly elections.

Elsewhere in Europe

Finland
The Constitution of Finland, as written in 1918, was originally similar to the French system of 40 years later. It included explicit provisions that the president focuses on national security and international relations. The arrangement was a compromise between monarchists and parliamentarists. In essence, a strong presidency was adopted instead of a constitutional monarchy. The new constitution of 2000 reduced the power of the president by transferring the power to choose a prime minister to the parliament. Cohabitation has occurred frequently, as Finland has multiple powerful parties which are not highly polarized between left and right, and also since the terms of a parliament are shorter (four years) than the presidential terms (six years). Theoretically, the president should remain strictly non-partisan, and presidents have usually formally renounced party membership while in office.

Georgia
Georgia underwent a period of cohabitation from 2012 to 2013, occasioned by the defeat of the ruling United National Movement party by the opposition Georgian Dream coalition in the 2012 parliamentary election. At the same time, a new constitutional system came into effect and the leader of the defeated party, the incumbent President Mikheil Saakashvili, had to appoint the Georgian Dream leader, Bidzina Ivanishvili, as prime minister. According to the European Commission report, with the expiration of Saakashvili's two terms as president and the victory of the Georgian Dream candidate, Giorgi Margvelashvili, in the 2013 presidential election, Georgia completed a complex and peaceful transition from a presidential to a parliamentary system. The period of cohabitation was assessed in the same report as "uneasy but functioning."

Poland

The president of Poland is required to be non-partisan while in office, but so far all presidents were elected as partisan candidates. A cohabitation occurred in 2007, when President Lech Kaczyński was forced to appoint Donald Tusk, his main rival in 2005 presidential election as prime minister.

Romania
The 2012 Romanian political crisis was a major political conflict between Prime Minister Victor Ponta of the Social Democratic Party and the centre-right President Traian Băsescu, after the former was asked to form a government in May 2012. The dispute degenerated into civil disobedience and alleged democratic backsliding, lasting until the two sides signed an agreement on institutional cohabitation in December.

There have been six periods of cohabitation in Romania, involving two presidents and five prime ministers.

Băsescu-Tăriceanu cohabitation (2007–2008)
This cohabitation occurred owing to the dismissal of the ministers belonging to the Democratic Party (PD), which had supported President Băsescu's candidacy, and which had counted Băsescu among its members before his election in 2004, in April 2007. This dismissal led to the formation of the second Tăriceanu government, comprising the National Liberal Party (PNL) and the Democratic Union of Hungarians in Romania (UDMR). The coalition government, while commanding a minority of MPs, was externally supported by the Social Democratic Party (PSD). Tăriceanu's term as prime minister ended in December 2008, following the legislative election the previous month, thus ending the cohabitation.

Băsescu-Ponta cohabitation (2012–2014)
The cohabitation between President Băsescu and Prime Minister Ponta began after the successful vote of no confidence against the government led by Mihai Răzvan Ungureanu, which was supported by the Democratic Liberal Party (PDL), the National Union for the Progress of Romania (UNPR) and the Democratic Union of Hungarians in Romania (UDMR). A new government took office, which included the Social Democratic Party (PSD) and the National Liberal Party (PNL) in May 2012, under the leadership of Victor Ponta. Ponta's first term in office was marked by a major political crisis between him and President Băsescu, leading up to the suspension of the latter and an impeachment referendum in July 2012. The new parliamentary majority was reinforced after the legislative election in December 2012, as the Social Liberal Union (USL) obtained a supermajority of seats. The alliance eventually dissolved in February 2014. This period of cohabitation ended in December 2014, when President Băsescu left office, being replaced by Klaus Iohannis.

Iohannis-Ponta cohabitation (2014–2015)
President Klaus Iohannis began his term as President in December 2014, having won the presidential election a month before ahead of the incumbent prime minister, Victor Ponta. Since a legislative election was not held, the parliamentary majority was unchanged, and Ponta was able to remain as prime minister, despite his loss. Victor Ponta resigned in November 2015, being replaced by Dacian Cioloș.

Iohannis-Grindeanu cohabitation (2017)
A legislative election was held in December 2016, which led to the formation of a coalition government, including the Social Democratic Party (PSD) and the Alliance of Liberals and Democrats (ALDE). The leader of the Social Democratic Party, Liviu Dragnea, took the office of president of the Chamber of Deputies, while Sorin Grindeanu assumed the position of prime minister. Grindeanu was eventually dismissed by a vote of no confidence due to tensions within the governing coalition in June 2017, and he was replaced by Mihai Tudose, of the same party.

Iohannis-Tudose cohabitation (2017–2018)
The Tudose cabinet took office amid the dismissal of the previous cabinet, led by Sorin Grindeanu, in June 2017. The prime minister was Mihai Tudose, who had been the minister of economy in the previous government. It comprised the same parties which had participated in the Grindeanu government. Tudose chose to resign in January 2018, due to tensions within the governing coalition. He was replaced by Viorica Dăncilă.

Iohannis-Dăncilă cohabitation (2018–2019)
Viorica Dăncilă, a member of the European Parliament representing the Social Democratic Party of Romania, assumed the office of prime minister after the resignation of her predecessor, Mihai Tudose. She is the first female head of government of Romania.

Russia
In the Russia, the State Duma has to approve a prime minister chosen by the president. However, if the State Duma rejects the president's candidate(s) three times in a row the President has the right to dissolve the State Duma and call legislative elections, but he cannot do so within a year after the last election, which in this period may lead to cohabitation.

Though the rest of the time cohabitation is unlikely, it can occur when in the State Duma there is no stable majority loyal to the president. Thus, cohabitation evolved between 1998 and 1999, when the State Duma twice refused to appoint Viktor Chernomyrdin as prime minister. However, since the appointment of the new prime minister was caused by the recent default, there was a risk that the opposition would improve its result after the snap election, which in turn would lead to even more tension between President Boris Yeltsin and the State Duma, especially since at this time preparations for the impeachment process were already underway. In consequence, Boris Yeltsin had to nominate Yevgeny Primakov for prime minister, who had broad support among the left opposition.

Ukraine
A cohabitation in a semi-presidential system also existed in Ukraine between 2006 and 2010. After 2006 Ukrainian parliamentary election, Ukrainian President Viktor Yushchenko had to appoint Viktor Yanukovych, his rival from the 2004 presidential election, as prime minister in August 2006.

Asia

Palestinian National Authority
The Palestinian National Authority, a quasi-governmental organization responsible for administering the Palestinian territories, has operated within the framework of a semi-presidential republic since the creation of the office of prime minister in the spring of 2003. While the president has the power to appoint anyone as prime minister, there was an unspoken agreement upon the establishment of the office that the prime minister would be appointed from the majority party in the Legislative Council. This arrangement led to a period of cohabitation after the 2006 legislative election, in which Fatah President Mahmoud Abbas appointed Hamas leader Ismail Haniyeh prime minister after Hamas' victory in the elections. The cohabitation did not last long, however, as funds were withheld from the Palestinian Authority and hostilities between Fatah and Hamas broke out in December 2006, leading to the appointment of a caretaker government led by Salam Fayyad on June 14, 2007.

Sri Lanka
Sri Lankan politics for several years witnessed a bitter struggle between the president and the prime minister, belonging to different parties and elected separately, over the negotiations with the LTTE to resolve the longstanding civil war. Since 1978, Sri Lanka transferred from parliamentary system to semi-presidential system, which the president has more executive power.

Other countries
Cohabitation does not occur within standard presidential systems. While a number of presidential democracies, such as the United States, have seen power shared between a president and legislature of different political parties, this is another form of divided government. In this situation, the executive is directed by a president of one party who serves for a fixed term of years, even if and while the legislature is controlled by another party; in cohabitation, by contrast, executive power is divided between a president of one party and a cabinet of another party. Cohabitation thus only occurs in systems that have both parliamentary government (i.e. ministers accountable to parliament) and a directly elected executive president, i.e., semi-presidential systems. In a true parliamentary system, the head of state, whether president or constitutional monarch, has no significant influence over the government.

As seen above, the theory of cohabitation is no longer limited to France. However, there are not many countries where the constitutional structure exists in which it could occur.  Since some of the new democracies of eastern Europe have adopted institutions quite similar to France, cohabitation may become more common, but if those countries elect their executives and legislature at or near the same time, as France is now doing, then cohabitation will be less likely.

See also

 Coalition government
 Grand coalition
 National unity government
 Divided government in the United States

References

Further reading
 http://news.bbc.co.uk/1/hi/world/south_asia/3256649.stm
 Raymond, G (2000) The President: Still a 'Republican Monarch'? in Raymond, G (ed) Structures of Power in Modern France, Macmillan Press, Basingstoke
 Sartori, G (1997) Comparative Constitutional Engineering, 2nd Ed., Macmillan Press, Basingstoke
 Elgie, R (2003) Political Institutions in Contemporary France, OUP, Oxford
 Knapp, A and Wright, V (2001) The Government and Politics of France, 4th Ed., Routledge, London
 Marrani, D (2009), 'Semi- Presidentialism à la française: the Recent Constitutional Evolution of the "Two-Headed" Executive', Constitutional FORUM constitutionnel, vol. 18, no. 2, 2009, available at: https://web.archive.org/web/20120511074704/http://www.law.ualberta.ca/centres/ccs/publications/journals/constitutionalforum/Volume18overview
Cohendet, M. (2005) 'The French Cohabitation, A Useful Experiment?' CEFC:China
People's Daily Online, (2002), France Bids Farewell to Right-Left 'Cohabitation’, Monday, June 17, 2002 (Last accessed 16 February 2006).
Shiloh, T. (2002) Muted reaction as France heads right, Monday, June 10, 2002 (Last accessed 15 February 2006).

Politics of France
Politics of Sri Lanka